This is a list of major gas station chains in the United States, Canada, and Mexico.  For notable single filling stations, see List of historic filling stations.

Filling station chains in North America

 Aloha Petroleum
 Alon
 American Gas
 Amoco
 ARCO 
 Billups
 BP
 Buc-ee's
 Carroll Motor Fuels
 Casey's General Stores
 CEFCO
 CENEX
 Certified
 Chevron
 Chuckles
 Circle K
 Citgo
 Clark Brands
 Conoco
 Costco brand gasoline
 Crown
 Cumberland Farms
 Delta Fuel Stations - Independently Branded Gas Stations
 Delta Sonic - Buffalo, New York
 Exxon 
 Etna
 Family Express - Indiana
 Fastrac - Upstate New York
 Fastrip
 Frontier
 Flying J 
 Gant
 GasAmerica
 Gas City, Ltd.
 GasTrac
 Getty
 Gas Land Petroleum
 Go-Mart
 Gulf
 Hele
 High's Dairy Stores
 Holiday
 Huck's
 Irving Oil
 King Soopers
 Krist
 Kum & Go
 Kwik Trip
 Kwik Fill
 Lassus Handy Dandy
 Liberty
 Love's
 Luke Oil — Indiana
 Lukoil
 Mapco Express
 Marathon Oil
 Maverik 
 McCoy Oil
 Meijer
 Minit Mart
 Mirabito
 Mobil
 Murphy USA
 OXXO Gas 
 Pemex
 Petro Canada
 Phillips 66
 Pilot
 QuickChek
 QuikTrip
 RaceTrac/Raceway
 Road Ranger
 Rotten Robbie
 Royal Farms
 Rutter's Farm Stores
 7-Eleven brand gasoline
 76
 Sam's Club
 Safeway 
 Servco
 Sheetz
 Shell
 Simonson Station Stores
 Sinclair
 Speedway
 Speedy Q
 Spinx
 Stewart's Shops
 Sunoco
 Tesoro
 Terrible Herbst
 Texaco
 Texas Born
 Thorntons Inc.
 Total
 Travelcenters of America 
 Travelers Oil
 Valero
 Wawa 
 Weigel’s

Canada
A list of gas station chains in Canada:
 Canadian Tire Petroleum (Canadian Tire Gas+) - over 300 stations across Canada; most located next to Canadian Tire retail stores or at service centres such as ONRoute
 Chevron Corporation - under license by Parkland Corporation (British Columbia, Alberta)
 Domo Gasoline - 80 stations in western Canada
 EKO - 80 stations in Quebec
 Esso - supplies approximately 2000 stations across Canada owned by various companies that use the Esso name under license from Imperial Oil, which is majority-owned by Exxon 
 Federated Co-operatives - Refine and supply 386 service stations in their network of independent co-operatives.
 Irving Oil - 769 stations in Atlantic Canada, Québec, eastern Ontario and New England
 MacEwen - stations in Ontario and Quebec
 Mobil - 233 stations acquired by Brookfield Business Partners from Loblaw Companies in 2017 and changed to the Mobil banner under licence from Imperial Oil
 OLCO Petroleum Group - 319 stations in Ontario and Quebec
 Petro-Canada - 1323 stations and 200 Petro-Pass stations across Canada; some acquired from BP (1983), Petrofina (1981) and Gulf Oil in the 1980s
 Pioneer Petroleum - 130 stations in Ontario
 7-Eleven brand gasoline
 Shell Canada - Canadian unit of Shell with 1800 stations across Canada
 Ultramar - 983 service stations, 87 truck stop facilities across Canada
 Wilson Fuel - mainly in Atlantic Canada with 9 as Wilson Gas Stops and 23 as Esso

Former
 Husky - retail operations sold to Parkland Corporation and Federated Co-operatives in 2021
 Mohawk Oil - acquired by Husky in 1998
 Sunoco - owned by Suncor Energy; operated 200 stations in Ontario, since 2009 converted to Petro-Canada
 Supertest Petroleum - later acquired by BP
 Texaco Canada - acquired by Ultramar in 1989

Mexico
A list of gas station chains in Mexico:
 76
 Akron
 ARCO
 BP
 Costco brand gasoline
 Chevron
 Gasmex
 G500 Network
 Grupo Eco
 Gulf
 Hidrosina
 KPetrom
 La Gas
 Mobil
 Orsan
 Oxxo Gas
 Pemex
 Phillips 66
 Petro7
 RedPetroil
 Rendichicas
 Repsol
 Shell
 Soriana brand gasoline
 Sunoco
 Total
 Vip Gas

See also
List of historic filling stations

References

 
 
North America transport-related lists
Lists of companies by industry
Energy-related lists